42 Leonis Minoris (42 LMi) is a solitary, bluish-white hued star located in the northern constellation Leo Minor. It has a visual apparent magnitude of 5.35, allowing it to be faintly seen with the naked eye. Parallax measurements place it at a distance of 412 light years.

42 LMi has a general stellar classification of B9 V, indicating that it is an ordinary B-type main-sequence star. However, Cowley et al. (1969) gave a slightly cooler class of A1 Vn, indicating that it is instead an A-type main-sequence star with 'nebulous' (broad) absorption lines due to rapid rotation. Its high luminosity and slightly enlarged diameter suggests that the object might be evolved.

There are two optical companions located near this star. Both have no relation to 42 LMi and is just moving with it by coincidence.

An X-ray emission with a luminosity of  has been detected around the object. A-type stars are not expected to emmit X-rays, so it must be coming from an unseen companion.

References

B-type main-sequence stars
Leo Minor
Leonis Minoris, 42
093152
52638
4203
BD+31 02180